Myfanwy Pavelic,  (April 27, 1916 – May 7, 2007) née Spencer, was a Canadian portrait artist.

Early life and career
Born in Victoria, British Columbia to an upper-class family, her first interests in fine art came after meeting with Emily Carr on Vancouver Island who later gave a brief series of instruction to Pavelic. Aside from a few months of study with a Yugoslav artist, she was self-taught as a painter. She studied at Miss Edgar's and Miss Cramp's School in Montreal, Canada as a boarder. During the Second World War, she held a one-person exhibition of portraits in Canada and donated the proceeds to the Red Cross. She later married a diplomat and had one daughter who suffered a disability.

Pavelic was one of few Canadian artists who had their work shown at the National Portrait Gallery, where her portrait of Yehudi Menuhin was displayed. She later donated the portrait of her friend to the National Portrait Gallery, making her the first known Canadian-born artist to be represented in their permanent collection.

Pavelic's childhood home was donated to the City of Victoria and converted into the art gallery.

Awards and honours
In 1984, she was made a Member of the Order of Canada. In 1984 she received an Honorary Doctorate from the University of Victoria and awarded the Order of Canada. In 2001, she was made a Member of the Order of British Columbia.

In 1997 she became a founding member of the Canadian Portrait Academy (CPA) and in 1998 won the F.H. Varley Medallion for Best Portrait Painting for her portrait of Pierre Elliott Trudeau. She was made a member of the Royal Canadian Academy of Arts.

Exhibitions 
 Collages: Myfanwy Pavelici, Art Gallery of Greater Victoria, Victoria, British Columbia, 1976
 Variations on the Figure, Utley Gallery, Victoria, British Columbia, 1977
 For Yehudi Menuhiin, Maltwood Art Gallery and Museum, University of Victoria, Victoria, British Columbia, 1983
 Yehudi Menuhin, Barbican Centre, London, England, 1985
 Relationships, North Park Gallery, Victoria, British Columbia, 1985
 Smalls, North Park Gallery, Victoria, British Columbia, 1985
 Altered Ego, Women in Focus Gallery, Vancouver, British Columbia, 1986
 Trudeau, Maltwood Art Museum and Gallery, University of Victoria, Victoria, British Columbia, 1992
 Myfanwy Pavelic: Inner Explorations, Art Gallery of Greater Victoria, British Columbia, 1994

References

External links
 Myfanwy Spencer Pavelic at The Canadian Encyclopedia
 From Menuhin to Trudeau, she painted them all at Victoria Times-Colonist
Canadian Portrait Academy

1916 births
2007 deaths
Canadian women painters
Members of the Order of British Columbia
Members of the Order of Canada
Artists from Victoria, British Columbia
Canadian portrait painters
Members of the Royal Canadian Academy of Arts
20th-century Canadian painters
20th-century Canadian women artists